Lac Sept-Îles Water Aerodrome, formerly , was located on Lac Sept-Îles, Quebec, Canada and was open from the middle of May until the middle of October.

References

Defunct seaplane bases in Quebec